The striated thornbill (Acanthiza lineata) is a species of bird in the family Acanthizidae. It is endemic to Australia, where its natural habitat is subtropical or tropical dry forests.

Taxonomy
John Gould described the striated thornbill in 1838, giving it the common name of striated acanthiza. Alternative common names include striped-crowned thornbill or tit-warbler, striated tit-warbler or tit, and green thornbill.

The striated thornbill still bears its original name.

A 2017 genetic study using both mitochondrial and nuclear DNA found that the ancestor of the striated thornbill diverged from that of the yellow thornbill around 6 million years ago.

Four subspecies are recognised.
 A. lineata alberti is found in southeast Queensland and is paler and more yellowish overall than the nominate subspecies. It has a bright orange-brown cap with prominent white streaks, and a yellow-olive back. There is a broad zone of intermediate birds stretching from Tenterfield south to Port Macquarie on the coast and Tamworth inland.
 A. lineata lineata is found across New South Wales and Victoria, with a zone between the Grampians and Warrnambool, and the South Australian border where intermediate forms between this and clelandii are found. 
 A. lineata clelandii is smaller and paler than the nominate subspecies, though has a more greyish back. It is found in southeastern South Australia to Adelaide.
 A. lineata whitei is smaller and darker than the nominate subspecies, with an overall greyish cast. It is found on Kangaroo Island.

Description
It has a russet- or orange-brown crown with cream streaks, dull yellow-olive upperparts, olive-grey flanks, and cream underparts heavily streaked with black.

The brown thornbill (A. pusilla) is similar but lacks the white-streaked orange-brown cap and lives in shrubs.

Feeding
The striated thornbill is predominantly insectivorous, generally forages in the canopy of eucalypt trees, gleaning leaves for prey. It often hangs upside-down while foraging. The striated thornbill also visits and feeds on extra-floral nectaries on the leaves of sunshine wattle (Acacia terminalis), helping pollinate the plant as it brushes against flower heads while feeding.

Breeding
Striated thornbills form flocks of 7–20 birds outside of breeding season from late summer to winter, before breaking up into groups of 2–4, composed of a breeding pair plus helper birds.

References

striated thornbill
Birds of Queensland
Birds of New South Wales
Birds of Victoria (Australia)
Birds of South Australia
Endemic birds of Australia
striated thornbill
Taxonomy articles created by Polbot